Methestrol dipropionate or methoestrol dipropionate (brand name Meprane Dipropionate), also known as promethestrol dipropionate or promethoestrol dipropionate or as dimethylhexestrol dipropionate, is a synthetic nonsteroidal estrogen of the stilbestrol group related to diethylstilbestrol that is or was used clinically. It is the dipropionate form of methestrol (or promethestrol), which, in contrast to methestrol dipropionate, was never marketed.

See also
 Benzestrol
 Dienestrol
 Fosfestrol
 Hexestrol

References

Abandoned drugs
Estrogen esters
Phenols
Propionate esters
Stilbenoids
Synthetic estrogens